Tauno Rissanen (25 September 1921 – 26 June 1975) was a Finnish equestrian. He competed in the individual jumping event at the 1948 Summer Olympics.

References

1921 births
1975 deaths
Finnish male equestrians
Olympic equestrians of Finland
Equestrians at the 1948 Summer Olympics
Sportspeople from Vyborg